Aaron Ewen (born 16 December 1996) is a New Zealand alpine skier who is representing New Zealand at the 2022 Winter Paralympics.

Biography
Born in France to English parents, Ewen moved to New Zealand when he was eight years old, settling in Tuakau. He began sit skiing in 2013 after receiving a spinal injury in a downhill mountain bike accident that left him without the use of his legs.

Ewen was selected for the New Zealand team for the 2018 Winter Paralympics, but had to withdraw after sustaining a hip fracture during training in December 2017. He returned to competition in 2019.

References

1996 births
Living people
New Zealand male alpine skiers
People from Tuakau
Alpine skiers at the 2022 Winter Paralympics
Paralympic alpine skiers of New Zealand
Sportspeople from Amiens
French male alpine skiers
French emigrants to New Zealand
French people of English descent
New Zealand people of English descent
Sportspeople from Waikato